Janice "Ginny" Redish is an American usability writer and consultant. She graduated from Bryn Mawr College and holds a Ph.D. in Linguistics from Harvard University.

Career
In 1979, she founded the Document Design Centre at the American Institutes for Research in Washington D.C. and remained there as Director for thirteen years. The aim of the DDC was to streamline workplace documents for government agencies and major private companies by developing online document template models. She founded one of the first independent usability test laboratories in the United States of America in 1985, monitoring users who would test new user interfaces and document templates for the multinationals such as IBM and Hewlett-Packard among others.

From 1992 onwards, she has worked as an independent consultant for government agencies and multinationals on usability and documentation. She has published three books on the subject, of effective writing, usability studies, and  web communication, one of which has been translated into Chinese.

Janice (Ginny) Redish, Ph.D. Business and services Janice (Ginny) Redish is president of Redish & Associates, Inc., a woman-owned, small business in Bethesda, Maryland, USA. Through her highly-interactive training and collaborative consulting, Ginny helps with content strategy, information design, plain language, usability, and writing for the web – including writing for the small screen of tablets and smart phones. Ginny is sought after as a speaker and workshop leader. She is a dynamic instructor who has trained thousands of writers and subject matter specialists in the United States, Canada, Asia, and Europe. Ginny has keynoted conferences in the United States, China, England, Finland, The Netherlands, Norway, Slovenia, and Spain. Many of Ginny's tailored training classes have been for economists, scientists, lawyers, and other professionals. She is an expert at helping professionals learn to meet their goals of technical and legal accuracy while also communicating clearly to their readers. Clients Ginny has completed more than 400 consulting, research, or training projects with clients in the United States, Canada, and Europe. This list names just a few of the many organizations Ginny has helped: • AARP • American Airlines • EPCOR (Canada) • Google • Hewlett-Packard • IBM • Marriott International • Nokia (Finland) • PayPal • SAP (Germany) • Vanguard • Xerox • and more than 50 state, provincial, and federal agencies

Awards and affiliations
 1995 - RIGO Award
1998 - Fellow of the Society for Technical Communication
1998 - President's Award, Usability Professionals' Association
 ACM, SIGDOC
 2001 - Goldsmith Award - IEEE - Alfred N. Goldsmith Award, Professional Communication Society
2004 - President's Award, Society for Technical Communication
2005 - Myron L. White Award, University of Washington, Department of Technical Communication
2005 - First award as the Outstanding Plain Language Leader in the Private Sector, Center for Plain Language
2008 - Ken R. Rainey Award for Excellence in Research, Society for Technical Communication
2013 - Lifetime Achievement Award, User Experience Professionals Association

Several Plain Language awards from the National Institutes of Health

Bibliography

Books
Letting Go of the Words: Writing Web Content that Works Elsevier/Kaufmann, 2007   ; in over 400 WorldCat libraries  (2nd edition, 2012)
Translated into Chinese by Dongni Wang as 胜于言传 : 网站内容制胜宝典 / Sheng yu yan zhuan : Wang zhan nei rong zhi sheng bao dian, 	机械工业出版社, Beijing : Ji xie gong ye chu ban she, 2009.   
Review, Journal of Web Librarianship, 2, no. 4 (2008): 607-608
Review, Journal of Technical Writing and Communication, 39, No. 1, (2009): 113-118
A Practical Guide to Usability Testing  (with 	Joseph S Dumas) 	Exeter, England ; Portland, Or. : Intellect Books, 1999 , in over 300 libraries according to WorldCat 
Review, Journal of Technical Writing and Communication, 26, No. 1, (1996): 97
Review, Technical communication. 42, no. 2, (1995): 361
Review, IEEE Transactions On Professional Communication Pc, 38, No. 1, (1995): 45
User and Task Analysis for Interface Design (with 	JoAnn T Hackos) New York : Wiley, 1998.  iun 390 libraries, according to WorldCat  
Review, Journal- American Society For Information Science, 49, No. 14, (1998): 1334
Review, IEEE transactions on professional communication. 42, no. 3, (1999): 188

Books, book chapters, and journal articles Ginny's book, Letting Go of the Words – Writing Web Content that Works,  continues to receive rave reviews on Amazon.com and in blogs. Her two earlier books on usability techniques are considered to be classics: • A Practical Guide to Usability Testing (with Joseph Dumas, Intellect Ltd., first edition, 1993; revised edition, 1999) • User and Task Analysis for Interface Design (with JoAnn Hackos, Wiley, 1998) In addition, Ginny serves on the editorial or executive board of 3 journals and has published numerous papers and book chapters on various aspects of accessibility, information design, plain language, usability, and writing for the web. Professional associations and awards Ginny has served on the board of directors of the Center for Plain Language, Society for Technical Communication, and User Experience Professionals Association.

References

External links
Official website, Redish and Associates

American women writers
Living people
Harvard University alumni
Bryn Mawr College alumni
Year of birth missing (living people)
21st-century American women